Shree Chandrodaya Higher Secondary School, also known as SCHSS is an educational institute located in Benighat VDC of Dhading district in Nepal. This school also runs Chandrodaya Multiple College, also known as CMC, affiliated with Tribhuvan University offering a 4-year BBS and 4-years B.Ed. This school successfully passed it glorious 50 years in 2066 B.S. This school is around 85 km far from Kathmandu near Prithvi Highway. It is also near to Trishuli River (about half a kilometre). It is one of the oldest schools of Dhading District.

Establishment, History and Development 

Officially the Shree Chandrodaya Secondary School was established in 1960 A.D. in Benighat VDC of Dhading District by the effort of local youth when The Education Department from Nuwakot District gave permission to operate a primary school and contributed NRs. 600 per annum. That NRs. 600 was the main source of school operation and in-addition local people also used to contribute some money. At the time of its establishment, it was located in the Benighat Bazar. The Sanskrit, English, Mathematics and Nepali were the subjects of study. At the very beginning, the school didn't have a proper building and the learning activity was started in a shrine-like house and there used to be merely 15-18 students. Even after a decade of its establishment, it has to wander here and there in order to get good land. It was like a mobile school. In 1965AD, the school was shifted from Benighat Bazar to Bishaltar, just above the current location of the school where the school has got its own premises. When the construction of Prithvi Highway  started, the location was inaccessible for the students and people again started thinking of shifting it nearby Prithvi Highway where the access is easy. In 1969, all the villagers came to a conclusion that the school should be shifted to the village of Bishaltar centring all the local dwellers where there is now the primary wing of Shree Chandrodaya Higher Secondary School. In 1977, it became a Lower Secondary School. In 1979, the Management Committee felt that the location was insufficient. So, they built a building and shifted the Lower Secondary School to the western part of the Bishaltar village called Baltar. The villagers from Benighat VDC, Dhusa VDC of Dhading District and Ghyalchok VDC of Gorkha District also contributed to make a building and other required infrastructures. Then slowly it became a Secondary School. As the infrastructure was not durable, its condition became miserable. At that time, an INGO Hanuman Onlus made first visit in the school and decided to help the school by building a new building. They built a 12-room cemented building along with toilet in association with another NGO COYON. In 2009, the school became a Higher Secondary School. Today, this school has developed a lot. Chandrodaya Multiple Campus was also established where BBS and B.Ed are taught. Its one of the main attraction of the passengers passing by during their journey to Kathmandu. This school is one of the richest schools of Dhading District. Every single room is decorated with a white board, well painted desks and benches, fans, and lights. As of January 15, 2016, the 57th yearly anniversary of this school was celebrated in a great way with District Education Officer as the special guest. And from April 2016, this school even started to provide technical education to the secondary class students; a feat only achieved by few schools in Dhading district. In 2074B.S, It became one of the few schools in Dhading district to introduce Plant Science subject from secondary level and in the same year, this school became first in SEE examination in the whole district as its top SEE graduate scored total GPA of 3.95.

School Premises and Area 

Shree Chandroday Higher Secondary School is divided into two wings: Primary wing where Primary classes are taught and Higher Secondary wing where Lower Secondary, Secondary, Higher Secondary and Bachelor's classes are taught. There are three buildings excluding one separate building for Chandrodaya Multiple Campus. The Primary Wing is about a half Kilometre far from the Secondary Wing. It is properly fenced and surrounded by wall on its four sides. Shree Chandrodaya Higher Secondary School is one of the richest school of Dhading District. It have land equal to 57 ropanies. A stationery shop and facility of canteen is also available inside its premises. There is also excellent facility of pure drinking water in this school. This school's ground is very popular all over the district. Many district level games including Rastrapati Running Shield are also played here. As of July 11, this school is also planning to build a hostel in near future.

Structure, Routine and Size 
Shree Chandrodaya Higher Secondary School is one of the largest school of the district. It provides education from Class One to Bachelor's degree. There are about 50 highly qualified and experienced teachers teaching in the school. There are about 1,900 students studying in this institute from Class One to Bachelor's Level. There are also two others helping staffs and an accountant in the school. There are two Committees that help in effective run of the institute and they are Management Committee and Guardians Committee. This school offers the students to choose two subjects from five options which are Optional Mathematics, Economics, Education, Accounting and Agriculture during their secondary education period (i.e. from Class 9 to Class 10). Shree Chandrodaya Higher Secondary School offers +2 level education in Management and Education faculty while Chandrodaya Multiple Campus offers +2 graduate students to study Bachelor of Business Studies (BBS) and Bachelor of Education (B.Ed). The classes for Bachelor's Level Class start usually in morning from 7AM whereas the regular classes for Primary, Lower Secondary, Secondary and Higher Secondary Level usually starts from 10AM. The students are divided into 4 groups or houses for their effective participation on Extra-Curricular Activities. Every Friday an Extracurricular Activity is conducted. There is also a child club which is founded by students called Chandrajyoti Child Club for their better knowledge and control over ECA. Computer Lab, Science Lab, Library, Principal Office Room, Campus Head Office Room, Meeting Room and Staff Room are also very well decorated. There are about 25 computers in this school and Science Lab and Library are also filled with different kinds of equipments and books respectively.

Contribution and popularity 

Shree Chandrodaya Higher Secondary School have contributed a lot in the educational development of Benighat VDC as well as its neighbours VDC. In Ghyalchok, Benighat, Dhusa and Salang, there are only three Higher Secondary Schools but this school is said to provide the most quality education, so students even come to study here from Krishna Bhir, Syadul, Janaugaun, Ghyalchok, Salang and many others VDCs which are almost more than 5 km far from this school. The SLC and HSEB results are also very satisfying looking the results of other public schools. This school is liked all over by the guardians and villagers near its area. This school have not only contributed in the field of education but also in the field of sports. The ground of Shree Chandrodaya Higher Secondary School have also made this school very popular. People even come picnic in this ground. Trishuli River is about half a kilometre far from this school which even makes it more an attractive picnic spot.

After 25 April and 12 May Earthquake 
Shree Chandrodaya Higher Secondary School resumed its regular class from the month of Jestha after a gap of one month due to destructive earthquake. Primary wing building was badly affected and students were taught in tents but no harm was found in Secondary wing. Although, the school was not that much damaged, the houses of many students were destroyed by April 2015 Nepal earthquake and its aftershocks.

See also 
List of schools in Nepal

References

Tribhuvan University
Educational institutions established in 1960
1960 establishments in Nepal
Buildings and structures in Dhading District